The 2018 Russian Artistic Gymnastics Championships was held in Kazan, Russia between 18–22 April 2018.

Medalists

Results

All-Around

Vault

Uneven Bars

Balance Beam

Floor Exercise

References

External links
  Official site

2018 in gymnastics
Artistic Gymnastics Championships
Russian Artistic Gymnastics Championships
April 2018 sports events in Russia